WOKH (102.7 FM) is an adult contemporary–formatted radio station licensed to serve Springfield, Kentucky, as well as Lebanon and Bardstown. The station is owned by Bardstown Radio Team, LLC as part of a duopoly with Bardstown–licensed country music station WBRT (1320 AM). The two stations share studios on South Third Street in downtown Bardstown, while its transmitter facilities are located off Lanham Road in rural Washington County west of Springfield.

History
Choice Radio sold WOKH to current ownership Bardstown Radio Team, owner of WBRT, in 2017.

The station has been assigned these call letters by the Federal Communications Commission since January 12, 2006.

Previous logos

References

External links
WOKH official website

OKH
Mainstream adult contemporary radio stations in the United States
Radio stations established in 1989
1989 establishments in Kentucky
Springfield, Kentucky